Faramarz Pilaram (1937–1983, or 1982) was an Iranian painter and educator. He is known for his abstract, and calligraphy-based modern paintings. Pilaram was a pioneer within the Saqqakhaneh school, a neo-traditionalist art movement. There were three major periods in his artistic career: figurative, decorative and calligraphic.

Early life and education 
Faramarz Pilaram was born on April 10, 1937 in Tehran, Pahlavi Iran. Pilaram attended Jalil Ziapour's School of Decorative Arts for Boys in Tehran, where he studied under Mahmoud Farshchian; and graduated in 1959. 

He attended the Faculty of Decorative Arts at Tehran University (now University of Tehran), where he graduated in 1965. And in 1968, Pilaram received his master’s degree in painting and interior design from the Faculty of Decorative Arts; where he studied under Shokouh Riazi. 

In 1974, Pilaram married his cousin Homa Darrati and had three children.

Career 
Pilaram was among the first group of Iranian artists focused on Iranian heritage and mythical motifs in their artwork, which makes him one of the founders of the Saqqakhaneh art movement. Other leading members of the movement including Massoud Arabshahi, Mohammad Ehsai, Parviz Tanavoli, and Hossein Zenderoudi.

Pilaram played a pivotal role in the establishment of Iran Gallery (Tālār-e Iran, later Talar-e Ghandriz) in Tehran, founded in 1964 by Pilaram, Mansoor Ghandriz, Rouin Pakbaz, Sadegh Tabrizi, Mohammad-Reza Jodat, Ghobad Shiva, Massoud Arabshahi, Sirus Malek, Farshid Mesghali, Parviz Mahallati, Morteza Momayez, and Hadi Hezareiy.

He was a founding member of the Group of Free Painters and Sculptors in Tehran, led by Marcos Grigorian.

Pilaram participated in the third and fourth Tehran Biennial. From 1972 to 1980, he taught design classes in the Faculty of Architecture at Iran University of Science and Technology.

Death and legacy 
In 1983, he died of a heart attack in Maḥmudabad, Mazandaran Province. Some sources state the date of death as 1982, possibly due to calendar conversation issues. Pilaram was buried in the Behesht-e Zahra cemetery in Tehran.

His artwork is in museum collections, including at the Museum of Modern Art, Metropolitan Museum of Art, Tehran Museum of Contemporary Art, and the Grey Art Gallery at NYU.

In 2006, Pilaram had a posthumous retrospective exhibition at Gallery 66 in Tehran, curated by Ali Bakhtiari.

See also 

 Calligraffiti
 Iranian modern and contemporary art

References 

1937 births
1983 deaths
University of Tehran alumni
Academic staff of Iran University of Science and Technology
20th-century Iranian painters
Iranian calligraphers
Artists from Tehran